Patience Pomary (born 14 July 1940) is a Ghanaian politician and an entrepreneur. She served as a member of parliament for the Hohoe North constituency in the Volta Region of Ghana and the only female member of Parliament from the Volta region.

Early life and education 
Patience Pomary was born on July 14, 1940. She attended Seddoh Business Commercial College where she obtained a Diploma in English, Shorthand and Typing.

Career 
In the 1970s, Pomary moved to Hohoe as an employee of the Ghana Cocoa Marketing Board. Pomary is a former member of the first parliament of the fourth republic of Ghana from January 1993 to January 1997, She is an Entrepreneur.

Politics 
Pomary engaged in active politics during the revolutionary days in Ghana, and was part of the constituent assembly that drafted the 1992 constitution of Ghana. As well as a member of the 31st December Women's Movement in Ghana. In 1991, during the National Democratic Congress primaries, she won against two male opponents to represent the Hohoe North constituency. Pomary was first elected during the 1992 Ghanaian parliamentary election on the ticket of the National Democratic Congress, She served for one term in Parliament. She lost the seat in the 1996 Ghanaian general election to Nathaniel Kwadzo Aduadjoe who won the seat for the National Democratic Congress with 39,008 votes which represented 62.80% of the share by defeating Stanley Tsaku Harker of People's National Convention (PNC) who obtained 4,264 votes which represented 6.90% of the share; Anthony Akoto-Ampaw of Convention People's Party (CPP) who obtained 3,740 votes which represented 6.00% of the share and Ray Kakrabah-Quarshie of New Patriotic Party (NPP) who obtained 2,752 votes which represented 4.40% of the share.

In 2019, Former President Jerry John Rawlings gives a brand new vehicle to madam Pomary, she expressed her gratitude to the former president for his support, stating that she was overwhelmed by the gesture. Former president said : << Madam Pomary's dedication and selfless commitment to her people was very commendable and expressed the hope that persons who dedicate their lives to the good of their communities and their country will be recognized by their own to inspire others >>.

Personal life 
She is a Christian.

References 

1940 births
Living people
National Democratic Congress (Ghana) politicians
Ghanaian MPs 1993–1997
20th-century Ghanaian businesspeople
People from Volta Region
Ghanaian Christians